The Medal "10 years of Astana" (Kazakh: Астанаға 10 жыл, Astanaǵa 10 jyl) is a state award of Kazakhstan. It was first introduced on May 6, 2008, in honor of 10 year anniversary of the city of Astana.

List of Recipients 

 Nursultan Nazarbayev - former President of Kazakhstan
 Imangali Tasmagambetov - former Prime Minister of Kazakhstan 
 Murat Maikeyev - Kazakh military leader
 Saken Zhasuzakov - Defence Minister of Kazakhstan
 Mukhtar Altynbayev - Kazakh military officer
 Nurlan Nigmatulin - Kazakh politician 
Kassym-Jomart Tokayev- President of Kazakhstan

Foreign 

 Abdullah II of Jordan
 Gurbanguly Berdimuhamedow - President of Turkmenistan
 Ilham Aliyev - President of Azerbaijan
 Ramzan Kadyrov - President of Chechnya
 Emomali Rahmon - President of Tajikistan
 Kurmanbek Bakiyev - former President of Kyrgyzstan
 Abdullah Gül - former President of Turkey
 Mikheil Saakashvili - former President of Georgia
 Serzh Sargsyan - former President of Armenia 
 Dmitry Medvedev - former President of Russia

References 

2006 establishments in Kazakhstan
Orders, decorations, and medals of Kazakhstan